Peter Stafford (1939–2007) was an American writer.

Peter Stafford may also refer to:
 Paul Tabori (1908–1974), British Hungarian author who wrote under the name Peter Stafford
 Peter Stafford (field hockey) (born 1978), New Zealand field hockey player